Giannitsa (in English also Yannitsa, Yenitsa) is the largest city in the regional unit of Pella and the capital of the Pella municipality, in the region of Central Macedonia in northern Greece.

The municipal unit Giannitsa has an area of 208.105 km2. Its population is 31,983 people (2011 census). It includes a few outlying villages (Mesiano, Melissi, Pentaplatanos, Archontiko, Ampelies and Damiano). The municipality Pella as a whole includes many villages and has 63,122 inhabitants. The city is located in the center of Macedonia between Mount Paiko and the plain of Giannitsa, and is the economic, commercial and industrial center of the Pella regional unit. European route E86 (Greek National Road 2) runs along the south of the city.

The former shallow, swampy, and variable-sized Giannitsa Lake or (ancient) Loudias Lake, fed by the Loudias River and south of the city, was drained in 1928-1932 by the New York Foundation Company. It or the surrounding marshland were sometimes called Borboros 'slime' or Borboros Limen.

About  from Giannitsa are the ruins of ancient Pella, birthplace of Alexander the Great and capital of ancient Macedonia.

Name

The city was founded as Yenice-i Vardar Ottoman Turkish يڭيجۀ واردار 'new (town) of Vardar' in around 1383 – 1387. It was sometimes called Evrenos Beg yöresi 'Evrenos Bey's town'.

The Turkish name, in the form Yenitsa (Γενιτσά), was used until February 1926 when its name was Hellenized as Giannitsa (Γιαννιτσά). In other languages, the city is called: Ottoman Turkish Yenice-i Vardar ('new-town of Vardar', as opposed to Yenice-i Karasu, modern Genisea, near Xanthi and known for tobacco), Turkish Yenice or Vardar Yenicesi, Enidzhe Vardar or Пазар Pazar.

Population

History

Prehistoric
In the area of "Old Market", on the southern hill of the city, there was an Early Neolithic settlement (late 7th to early 6th millennium BC). Giannitsa was also inhabited through the Bronze and Iron Ages. Incidental findings, such as coins, inscriptions, and sculptures indicate that the area was inhabited during the Hellenistic period (323-30BC). In ancient times, the area was called Bottiaea. In the vicinity of the city ancient towns of Pella and Kyrros and medieval metropolitan centre of Giannitsa were presented.

Ottoman

Though there was probably a pre-existing Byzantine castle in the vicinity, the importance of the city of Giannitsa begins with its foundation by Gazi Evrenos in around 1383 – 1387. Giannitsa became the base of the ghazi followers of Evrenos who took Macedonia and later Albania. The city was an important Ottoman cultural center and sacred area in the 15th and 16th centuries. Starting in the mid-15th century, Giannitsa became a center of literature and the arts. Under Ahmet Bey, a descendant of Gazi Evrenos, many mosques, schools, workhouses and charitable projects were founded. In 1519 (Hijri 925), its population consisted of 793 Muslim, 25 Christian and 24 Jewish households and it was a zeamet of Mevlana Ahmet Çelebi.

In the early 20th century, Giannitsa was a battleground between Bulgarian and Greek partisans in the Macedonian struggle. Penelope Delta's novel Secrets of the Swamp (referring to the shores of Giannitsa Lake) is a romanticised account of this from the Greek point of view.

Balkan wars

Giannitsa "retained its emphatically Turkish character up to 1912" and members of the Evrenos family lived in the city in a large palace in the center of town until then. In the First Balkan War, the Battle of Giannitsa  (20 October 1912) was one of the most important battles the Hellenic Army fought.

German occupation
The German army invaded Giannitsa on April 11, 1941 . On April 20, 1941, some Austrian forces arrived. The municipal registry of Giannitsa confirms four random killings in various parts of the city. On 16 September 1943, the Municipality of Giannitsa, headed by the Mayor, Thomas Magriotis and the help of local soccer teams organized a demonstration in the city and indulge in German commandant a text against the intention of the Germans to surrender Central Macedonia to the Bulgarians. According to oral testimony on November 13, 1943, the Germans arrested around 50 people, whom they transferred to the camp of Pavlos Melas at Thessaloniki and they killed thirteen. In this attack there were no casualties. On 23 March 1944, the village was burned, and the place deserted. Eleftherohori lost 19 lives. On 5 August 1944, the Austrian soldier Otmar Dorne left the German occupation army and joined the 30th Constitution of the E.L.A.S, based in Mount Paiko. The defection of Dorne, and the presence of the Wehrmacht sergeant Schubert, led to mass reprisals on 14 September 1944 in Giannitsa: about 120 residents of Giannitsa were executed by forces of the Jagdkommando Schubert with the collaboration of Greek units under the command of G. Poulos. Among those executed was the Mayor, Thomas Mangriotis. The Swedish ambassador Timberg indicated that one third of the city was destroyed by fire. The citizens left the city. Emile Wenger visited Giannitsa few days after the mass execution, as a representative of the International Red Cross and wrote "Giannitsa is already a dead city". On 20 September 1944, a citizens' committee sent a message to the National Government stating the facts and asking for weapons. The Germans left Giannitsa on November 3, 1944.

During this period in the city is formed Bulgarian action committee and later Central Bulgarian-macedonian committee, headed by the local citizen Georgi Kayafov. Also a Thessaloniki bulgarian club branch was formed by locals Georgi Yankulov, Perikle Gyupchinov, Hristo Panayotov and Georgi Kayafov.

Landmarks

Monuments

Giannitsa was an important center in the Ottoman period, and several important monuments survive, such as the Tombs of Gazi Evrenos (built in 1417) and Gazi Ahmed Bey, the Kaifoun Baths, the Great Mosque, the Army Mosque, the hammam of Evrenos, and the Clock Tower, built from 1667 to 1668 by the Ottomans. (The choice of location was made with military criteria because they wanted to control the commercial activity that took place across the city and throughout central Macedonia.) These monuments have been declared historical monuments by the Greek Archaeological Service.

Points of interest include also the Cathedral Church of Giannitsa (achieved in 1860), the Neoclassical Multicenter, the Filippeio tourist center, the Macedonian tombs, and the prehistoric settlement of Archontiko.

Museums
 The Folklore Museum of Giannitsa (opened in October 1977) by the "Philippos" History and Folklore Association to promote local history and traditions.
 The Military museum of Giannitsa (opened 24 February 2012), displays photographs, texts, weapons, uniforms, medals and other materials, with a particular emphasis on the Battle of the Swamp and the Balkan Wars 1912–1913.

Statues

 Black Statue - The Memorial of Giannitsà, erected at the eastern entrance to the town in 1926 in honor and remembrance of the battle of Giannitsà (Sculptor: Gregory Zevgolis).
 Mass Grave, a list of the residents who were executed at the 1st Primary School on 14 September 1944 by German troops.
 Alexander the Great,  near the Cultural Center, unveiled on 20 October 2009, the anniversary of the liberation of the city and the Day of the Macedonian Struggle.
 Philip II of Macedon, located in the park of the "Filippio" tourist center.  Near the statue, there is a relief depicting the Macedonian phalanx.
A bust of the Makedonomachos Gonos Yiotas in Gonou Yiota Square.

Aravissos

The surrounding grove and creek include a popular park.

Economy
Giannitsa is predominantly a rural area. The draining of the Lake Giannitsà left fertile soil for agriculture, leading to population growth in the region.

Entertainment
The focus of the social life of the city is at the central pedestrian street, where people gather to eat and drink or to take a walk. Giannitsa was one of the first cities that founded Open Theatre (3000 seats) and became an institution for cultural events and big names in theater and music, every year, the last month of summer giving a culture festival character . Also various theatrical and musical events take place in a closed theater located internally of the Cultural Centre which has a modern architecture. In the first days of September there is a big market for about a week. The DI. K. E. P. A. P. (ΔΗ. Κ. Ε. Π. Α. Π) is a charitable non-profit cultural organization founded in 1996 that develops music, visual arts, dance, film and other arts.

Loudias river
Seven kilometers south of the center is the Loudias River, which has a sailing center. The Nautical Club of Giannitsa (NOG) teaches canoeing, kayaking, and rowing.

Districts

 Center
 St. George
 Ayía Paraskeví
 Sfageia
 Sinoikismos
 Mitropoli
 St. Konstantinos
 Tsali (Nea Trapezounta)
 Filippeio
 Kapsali
 Palaia agora

Local Media

Newspapers
 O Logos tis Pellas (weekly; Greek Ο λόγος της Πέλλας)
 Giannitsa (daily; Greek Γιαννιτσά)

TV station
 Pella TV (Greek Πέλλα τηλεόραση)

Online Newspapers
 Pella24
 Pellanet
 Giannitsa City news
 Logos Pellas

Sports
The most popular team is the Anagennisi Giannitsa football team which plays at the Municipal Stadium.

There is a motocross track northwest of the city, in the foothills of Mount Paiko, where local, Greek, and European races are run.

At the river Loudias, there are rowing races in which the Nautical Club participates.

Twin towns and sister cities
Giannitsa is twinned with three cities:
  Larnaca, Cyprus, since 2003
  Crotone, Italy, since 2010
  New Britain, Connecticut, United States, since 2010

Notable people
 Gazi Evrenos (died 1417), founder of the Ottoman city, whose mausoleum is in the center of town
 K̲h̲ayālī (died 1556), Ottoman poet
 Āgehī (died 1577), Ottoman poet and historian
 Georgios Gonos Giotas (1880–1911), revolutionary in the Macedonian Struggle
 Ahmet Derviş (1883–1932), military officer in the Ottoman and Turkish armies
 Melina Aslanidou (born 1974), singer born in Germany, but raised in Giannitsa
 Elisavet Mystakidou (born 1977), Greek Olympic silver medalist in taekwondo
 Dimitris Pelkas (born 1993), soccer player playing as an attacking midfielder for PAOK FC
 Andreas Varsakopoulos (born 1990), Television personality, personal trainer, Lecturer currently living in South Korea

References

External links
 Δήμος Πέλλας, official site of the municipality of Pella
 Google Earth view of Giannitsa and the drained lakebed

Populated places in Pella (regional unit)
Macedonia under the Ottoman Empire
1372 establishments in Europe